Sir Arthur Frederick Peterson (12 October 1859 – 12 May 1922) was a leading barrister and an English High Court judge in the Chancery Division from 1915 to 1922.

He was born in Melbourne, Australia, the son of William Peterson of Melby, Shetland Islands, a station owner in Victoria, Riverina and Queensland and principal of the well known Flinders Street firm. He was a cousin of Sir William Peterson, principal of McGill University.

Arthur was sent to England at the age of twelve for his education and attended Dulwich College. He went on to study at Corpus Christi College, Oxford. He had a distinguished scholastic career and later entered Lincoln's Inn. On 22 November 1915 he was created a judge of the Chancery Division having not long previously been created a King's Counsel. During the First World War he was special constable detailed for duty at Buckingham Palace. He was unmarried.

References

External links
 Peterson images

1859 births
1922 deaths
Knights Bachelor
20th-century English judges
Lawyers from Melbourne
20th-century King's Counsel
Alumni of Corpus Christi College, Oxford
Chancery Division judges
People educated at Dulwich College
Members of Lincoln's Inn
Australian emigrants to England
Metropolitan Special Constabulary officers